José María Sá Lemos (1892–1971) was a Portuguese sculptor.

1892 births
1971 deaths
Portuguese sculptors
Male sculptors
People from Vila Nova de Gaia
20th-century sculptors